Kaliyoonjalu is a 1997 Malayalam drama, film starring Mammootty, Shalini, Shobana and Dileep. It was directed by Anil Babu and produced by Siyad Koker under the banner of Koker Films and was a commercial success. The film completed 50 days in Mymoon theatre, Eranakulam.

Plot
After the death of their parents, Nandagopal (Mammootty) raises his sister Ammu (Shalini), who is suffering from epilepsy. She is a pampered child. Nandan agrees to marry Gouri (Shobana) on the condition that her brother Venu (Dileep) marries Ammu. The fact that Ammu has epilepsy is revealed only after Nandan and Gouri get married. Venu, who was in love with another girl Radha, agrees to marry Ammu to save his sister's relation. Nandan still remains concerned about his sister, who is now living with Venu in his house.  This disturbs a self-respecting Venu a lot and arguments came one after the other in their lives. A party is set on the day of Ammu's birthday both by Nandan (at his house) and by Venu (for his friends). Ammu refuses to wear the saree bought by her husband and wore the saree bought by Nandan. He leaves the place in a fury, but later comes back knowing about Ammu's pregnancy. Everyone concerned about her health asks her to terminate the pregnancy, to which Ammu does not agree. Later, they have a baby. On another occasion, Venu feeling humiliated,  leaves furiously on a motorcycle. Nandan goes to convince him, but Venu meets his death in a tragic accident. This infuriates even Ammu, let alone Venu's sister Gouri. Ammu, with her child, goes missing. Later, they find her at Rameshwaram where she is performing her husband's last rituals. Leaving the child with Nandan and Gouri, Ammu dies by suicide.

Cast
Mammootty as Nandagopalan, Deputy Collector, Ammu's brother and Gauri's husband
Shalini as Ammu (voice dubbed by Ambily), Nandan's sister venu's wife
Shobana as Gauri Nandagopalan nandan's wife and venu's sister
Dileep as Venugopalan, Gauri's brother and Ammu's husband
Karamana Janardanan Nair as Raghavan Maashu
Oduvil Unnikrishnan 
Lakshmi
Praveena as Radha
Mala Aravindan as Paraman
Meena Ganesh as Vellachi
Maria
Baby Manjima as Younger Ammu

Soundtrack

References

External links
 

1990s Malayalam-language films
1997 films
1997 drama films
Films scored by Ilaiyaraaja
Films based on Malayalam novels